The calcium-sensing receptor (CaSR) is a Class C G-protein coupled receptor which senses extracellular levels of calcium ions.  It is primarily expressed in the parathyroid gland, the renal tubules of the kidney and the brain. In the parathyroid gland, it controls calcium homeostasis by regulating the release of parathyroid hormone (PTH). In the kidney it has an inhibitory effect on the reabsorption of calcium, potassium, sodium, and water depending on which segment of the tubule is being activated.

Since the initial review of CaSR, there has been in-depth analysis of its role related to parathyroid disease and other roles related to tissues and organs in the body. 1993, Brown et al. isolated a clone named BoPCaR (bovine parathyroid calcium receptor) which replicated the effect when introduced to polyvalent cations. Because of this, the ability to clone full-length CaSRs from mammals were performed.

Signal transduction
The release of PTH is inhibited in response to elevations in plasma calcium concentrations and activation of the calcium receptor. Increased calcium binding on the extracellular side gives a conformational change in the receptor, which, on the intracellular side, initiates the phospholipase C pathway, presumably through a Gqα type of G protein, which ultimately increases intracellular concentration of calcium, which inhibits vesicle fusion and exocytosis of parathyroid hormone. It also inhibits (not stimulates, as some sources state) the cAMP dependent pathway.

Pathology
Mutations that inactivate a CaSR gene cause familial hypocalciuric hypercalcemia (FHH) (also known as familial benign hypercalcemia because it is generally asymptomatic and does not require treatment), when present in heterozygotes. Patients who are homozygous for CaSR inactivating mutations have more severe hypercalcemia. Other mutations that activate CaSR are the cause of autosomal dominant hypocalcemia or Type 5 Bartter syndrome. An alternatively spliced transcript variant encoding 1088 aa has been found for this gene, but its full-length nature has not been defined.

Therapeutic application
The drugs cinacalcet and etelcalcetide are allosteric modifiers of the calcium-sensing receptor. They are classified as a calcimimetics, binding to the calcium-sensing receptor and decreasing parathyroid hormone release.

Calcilytic drugs, which block CaSR, produce increased bone density in animal studies and have been researched for the treatment of osteoporosis. Unfortunately clinical trial results in humans have proved disappointing, with sustained changes in bone density not observed despite the drug being well tolerated. More recent research has shown the CaSR receptor to be involved in numerous other conditions including Alzheimer's disease, asthma and some forms of cancer, and calcilytic drugs are being researched as potential treatments for these. Recently it has been shown that biomimetic bone like apatite inhibits formation of bone through endochondral ossification pathway via hyperstimulation of extracellular calcium sensing receptor.

Interactions 
Calcium-sensing receptor has been shown to interact with filamin.

References

Further reading

External links 
 
 CASRdb - Calcium Sensing Receptor Database, McGill University

G protein-coupled receptors